Fennell  is a surname. Notable people with the surname include: 

Alan Fennell (1936–2001), British writer and editor
Albert Fennell (1920–1988), British film and television producer
Dale Fennell (born 1957), English rugby player, son of Jack
Dave Fennell (born 1953), Canadian football player
Desmond Fennell (1929–2021), Irish writer, philosopher, and linguist
Eamonn Fennell (born 1984), Gaelic football player
Emerald Fennell (born 1985), English actress, filmmaker, and writer
Frederick Fennell (1914–2004), American music conductor
Jack Fennell (1933–2019), English rugby player, father of Dale
Jan Fennell, dog trainer and writer
Jane Fennell, Australian  TV presenter
John Fennell, Canadian luger
John Lister Illingworth Fennell, British historian of Russia
Joseph Fennell (1835–1919), Anglican priest
Kevin Fennell, American drummer, Guided by Voices 
L. Raymond Fennell (1893–1986), Canadian politician
Marc Fennell (born 1985), Australian film critic, technology journalist, radio personality and author
Nuala Fennell (1935–2009), Irish economist and politician
Patricia Fennell, American writer and businessperson
Robert Fennell (born 1956), American politician and restaurateur 
Susan Fennell (born 1953), Canadian politician, mayor of Brampton, Ontario
Thomas Fennell (disambiguation)
Willie Fennell (1920–1992), Australian actor and comedian

See also
Finnell, a surname
Fennel, a plant